Bainbridge Ferry, also known as the Randol's Ferry and Littleton's Ferry, is a historic ferry landing on the western shore of the Mississippi River at Cape Girardeau, Missouri. It is the site of a ferry that was established about 1805 and operated in the 19th century. The ferry was located at one of two places on the Mississippi River utilized by the Cherokee to cross from Illinois to Missouri on the Trail of Tears of 1837–1839.

It was listed on the National Register of Historic Places in 2007.

References

Archaeological sites on the National Register of Historic Places in Missouri
Buildings and structures in Cape Girardeau County, Missouri
National Register of Historic Places in Cape Girardeau County, Missouri